Anderson Niangbo (born 6 October 1999) is an Ivorian professional footballer who plays for Belgian club Gent.

Career

Club career
Niangbo started his career at Olympic Sport d’Abobo. In January 2018 he moved to Austria for FC Red Bull Salzburg, where he received a contract that ran until June 2022, but where he was initially to be used for Salzburg's farm team, FC Liefering.

In March 2018 he made his debut for Liefering in the Austrian Football Second League when he was in the starting line-up against SV Ried on matchday 22 of the 2017–18 season and was replaced by Aldin Aganovic in the stoppage time. On 6 July 2019, Niangbo was loaned to Wolfsberger AC. After 17 appearances for the team in the Austrian Bundesliga, in which he scored seven goals, he was ordered back to Salzburg in January 2020 and initially moved up to the FC Red Bull Salzburg squad.

About a week after his return, he moved to Belgium to Gent, where he received a contract that ran until June 2024.

On 9 August 2021, he returned to Austria and joined Sturm Graz on a season-long loan.

Honours
Ivory Coast U23
Africa U-23 Cup of Nations runner-up:2019

References

External links

Living people
1999 births
Ivorian footballers
Ivory Coast youth international footballers
Association football midfielders
FC Liefering players
Wolfsberger AC players
FC Red Bull Salzburg players
K.A.A. Gent players
SK Sturm Graz players
2. Liga (Austria) players
Austrian Football Bundesliga players
Belgian Pro League players
Ivorian expatriate footballers
Ivorian expatriate sportspeople in Austria
Ivorian expatriate sportspeople in Belgium
Expatriate footballers in Austria
Expatriate footballers in Belgium